Denny Chin (陳卓光; born April 13, 1954) is a Senior United States circuit judge of the United States Court of Appeals for the Second Circuit, based in New York City. He was a United States District Judge of the United States District Court for the Southern District of New York before joining the federal appeals bench. President Bill Clinton nominated Chin to the district court on March 24, 1994, and Chin was confirmed August 9 of that same year. On October 6, 2009, President Barack Obama nominated Chin to the Second Circuit. He was confirmed on April 22, 2010, by the United States Senate, filling the vacancy created by Judge Robert D. Sack who assumed senior status. Chin was the first Asian American appointed as a United States District Judge outside of the Ninth Circuit.

Early life, education, and career
Chin was born in 1954 in Kowloon, Hong Kong and came to the U.S. in 1956. He graduated from Stuyvesant High School in 1971. He graduated magna cum laude with a B.A. in psychology from Princeton University in 1975 after completing a 130-page long senior thesis titled "The Old Ones of Chinatown: A Study of the Elderly Chinese." While a student at Princeton, Chin was a staff writer and later managing editor at The Daily Princetonian. In 1978, Chin graduated from Fordham University School of Law with a Juris Doctor, where he was the Managing Editor of the Fordham Law Review. Chin currently teaches first year Legal Writing at Fordham as an adjunct professor.

Following a 1978 to 1980 clerkship with Judge Henry Werker in the Southern District, Chin worked for the law firm of Davis Polk & Wardwell from 1980 to 1982. He was an Assistant United States Attorney for the Southern District from 1982 to 1986. In 1986, Chin left the U.S. Attorney's Office and started a law firm, Campbell, Patrick & Chin, with two colleagues from the U.S. Attorney's Office. In 1990, he joined the law firm Vladeck, Waldman, Elias & Engelhard, P.C., where he specialized in labor and employment law and represented employees and unions.

Federal judicial service

District court service

President Bill Clinton nominated Chin to the Southern District bench on March 24, 1994, to a new seat created by 104 Stat. 5089. The United States Senate confirmed Chin on August 9, 1994, and Chin received his commission the next day. His service as a district court judge was terminated on April 26, 2010, when he was elevated to the United States Court of Appeals for the Second Circuit.

Court of Appeals service
On October 6, 2009, President Obama nominated Chin to the United States Court of Appeals for the Second Circuit. The United States Senate Committee on the Judiciary reported Chin's nomination to the full Senate on December 10, 2009 and he was confirmed by a 98–0 vote on April 22, 2010. He received his judicial commission on April 23, 2010. He was sworn in as a Circuit Judge on April 26, 2010. Chin assumed senior status on June 1, 2021.

Notable cases
In 2001, Chin rejected a motion by the Parents Television Council (PTC) to dismiss a lawsuit that the World Wrestling Federation (now World Wrestling Entertainment) filed against it. At the time, the PTC had been campaigning for advertisers to withdraw sponsorship of WWE's flagship program SmackDown because it believed that the program caused the violent deaths of four children. Chin's ruling came on the grounds that WWF had a sound basis in suing the PTC over defamation, interference with business, and copyright infringement. PTC and WWE settled out of court and, as part of the settlement agreement, the PTC paid WWF $3.5 million USD and PTC president Bozell issued a public apology.

In Fox v. Franken, Chin denied Fox News Channel (who alleged a trademark violation) an injunction against Al Franken's Book Lies and the Lying Liars Who Tell Them: A Fair and Balanced Look at the Right.

Chin also presided over the criminal prosecution of Larry Stewart, the handwriting expert who was accused of committing perjury during the trial of Martha Stewart (no relation). Larry Stewart was acquitted by a jury.

Chin presided over the criminal trial of Pak Dong-seon in connection with Pak's alleged involvement in the scandal surrounding the United Nations Oil-for-Food Program. Pak was convicted by a jury and sentenced by Chin to 5 years in prison.

Chin dismissed the suit Sam Sloan vs. Paul Truong and Susan Polgar in which Sloan accused Susan Polgar and Paul Truong of posting thousands of obscene "Fake Sam Sloan" remarks in his name over a two-year period in an effort to win election to the board of the United States Chess Federation (Polgar and Truong were elected to the board and Sloan was defeated).

Chin presided over the criminal trial of Oscar Wyatt, the Texas oil executive accused of making kick-backs to the Saddam Hussein regime during the UN Oil-For-Food Program.  In the middle of his trial, Wyatt changed his plea to guilty as part of a plea bargain with the government.

He was assigned the Google Book Search Settlement Agreement case on January 8, 2009, after the death of the previous supervising judge. On March 23, 2011, Chin rejected Google's plan to digitize every book published, saying the plan violated copyright laws. In November 2013, Chin dismissed Authors Guild et al. v. Google. On April 18, 2016, the Supreme Court turned down an appeal.
 
In 2012, Chin presided over the criminal sentencing of Anil Kumar, a senior executive of McKinsey and Company in the Galleon Group insider trading investigation. Chin sentenced Kumar to 2 years of probation.

In 2016, Chin joined the panel that upheld Tom Brady's suspension by Commissioner Roger Goodell for the Deflatgate scandal

U.S. v. Madoff

In 2009  Chin presided over U.S. v. Madoff.  Madoff admitted to committing securities fraud via a Ponzi scheme starting in the early 1990s, which involved potentially as much as $65 billion.  On March 12, 2009, Madoff pleaded guilty to 11 federal charges relating to the scheme.  Following his pleading, Chin revoked Madoff's $10 million bail and ordered him to report immediately to jail at the request of the federal prosecutors, citing that Madoff had both the resources and the incentive to flee before his formal sentencing.  On June 29, 2009, Chin accepted the prosecutor's recommendation to sentence Madoff to a prison term of 150 years, thus effectively handing down a life sentence.  Chin explained that imposing the maximum sentence on Madoff was appropriate because he had concluded that Madoff's crimes were "staggering" and "extraordinary evil" and wanted the sentence to have a stronger deterrent effect.

See also
Barack Obama Supreme Court candidates
Chinese Americans in New York City
List of Asian American jurists
List of first minority male lawyers and judges in the United States

References

External links
Hon. Denny Chin, Southern District of New York Court site
"Chin Shares Experiences as Federal District Court Judge , April 7, 2003, Law Grounds News, University of Virginia School of Law.

1954 births
Living people
21st-century American judges
American jurists of Chinese descent
Assistant United States Attorneys
Fordham University School of Law alumni
Hong Kong emigrants to the United States
Judges of the United States Court of Appeals for the Second Circuit
Judges of the United States District Court for the Southern District of New York
Lawyers from New York City
Princeton University alumni
Stuyvesant High School alumni
United States court of appeals judges appointed by Barack Obama
United States Department of Justice lawyers
United States district court judges appointed by Bill Clinton
Davis Polk & Wardwell lawyers
Fordham University faculty
20th-century American judges